The 1st TVyNovelas Awards, is an Academy of special awards to the best of soap operas and TV shows for the last year in Mexico. The awards ceremony took place in 1983 in the Mexico City.

Summary of awards and nominations

Winners and nominees

Other

The "show" of the year 
 Yoshio
 Chen Kai
 The band of Victor Guzman
 The Five Fingers
 Jazz Group Elias Selem

References

External links 
 TVyNovelas Awards in esmas.com

TVyNovelas Awards
TVyNovelas Awards ceremonies
TVyNovelas Awards
TVyNovelas Awards
TVyNovelas Awards
TVyNovelas Award
Premios TVyNovelas